Brincat is a surname. Notable people with the surname include:

Carl Brincat, British actor
Joe Brincat (born 1970), Maltese footballer
Lauren Brincat (born 1980), Australian performance and installation artist
Paul Brincat, Australian audio engineer

Maltese-language surnames